GPATCH11 is a protein that in humans is encoded by the G-patch domain containing protein 11 gene. The gene has four transcript variants encoding two functional protein isoforms and is expressed in most human tissues. The protein has been found to interact with several other proteins, including two from a splicing pathway. In addition, GPATCH11 has orthologs in all taxa of the eukarya domain.

Gene 
G-patch domain containing protein 11 is a protein that in humans is encoded by the gene GPATCH11 and located on chromosome 2, location 2p22.2. It also contains several aliases including CCDC75, and CENPY. The gene is 14,484 bp long and contains 9 exons. Though the function of the protein is not yet known, it is predicted to serve in nucleic acid binding and protein binding.

mRNA 
GPATCH11 has four predicted transcript variants, though only two are known to code for functional protein. Its longest form is unspliced and contains 9 exons whereas the second functional variant has 7 exons with exons 3 and 4 cut out.

Protein 
GPATCH11 has a molecular weight of about 33.3 kdal and is 285 amino acids long. It also comes in a second isoform that is 156 amino acids long. The gene contains a G-patch domain and the DUF 4138 domain. The G-patch domain itself is a novel domain found only in eukarya. BLAST searches of the human gene against bacteria, archaea, and viruses, support this finding.

Primary structure 
The following is the primary sequence of the long form of GPATCH11: 

The protein is rich in glutamic acid and is very highly charged. In addition, it is low in amino acids such as valine, threonine, phenylalanine, and proline. It is a soluble protein and has a nuclear export signal and bipartite nuclear import signal implying that it is localized in the nucleus.

Secondary structure 
The conserved areas of the protein have a secondary structure composed only of alpha-helices and coiled-coil regions.

Tertiary structure 
The image to the right is the predicted tertiary structure of GPATCH11 based on results obtained from I-tasser. The confidence score was very low though, so reliability is uncertain. However, it does match up with the secondary structure prediction of the protein being composed primarily of alpha-helices and coiled coils.

Protein expression 
Protein expression has been found in the endocrine and nervous system, along with the eye, breast, colon, liver, ovary, and 55 other tissues. Gene expression is found to be about 1.1 times the average. The highest expression is found in the brain and spinal cord, followed by the spleen. There are six areas in the brain where GPATCH11 is expressed above average including the olfactory areas, hippocampus, midbrain, pons, medulla, and cerebellum. In addition, expression levels increase in cancerous tissue compared to normal tissue.

Predicted Post-Translational Modification 
Using various tools at ExPASy the following are possible post-translational modifications for GPATCH11.
 3 possible CK2 phosphorylation sites
 6 possible PKC phosphorylation sites
 2 possible N-mirystoylation sites
 6 possible glycation sites

Protein Interaction 

The interaction between GPATCH11 and BAI3 was found via PSICQUIC, mentha, and STRING. The confidence score given by mentha is only .454, however, according to STRING the interaction between the two proteins has been experimentally determined by a validated two-hybrid approach. The two proteins are thought to have a direct physical interaction. BAI3 is a transmembrane protein and a p53 target gene. BAI3 may regulate the number of excitatory synapses that are formed on the hippocampus neurons, and may be involved in angiogenesis inhibition and suppression of glioblastoma. As GPATCH11does have higher expression than the average gene in the hippocampus and the spinal cord, this could be a real interaction.

The interaction between GPATCH11 and JUN could be real as JUN is both localized in the nucleus and associated with cancers. GPATCH11 tends to have higher expression in cancerous tissue compared to normal tissue, so interaction with other proteins highly expressed in cancers seems plausible.

Finally, the interactions between GPATCH11 and ZRSR2 and GPATCH11 and U2AF1 appear to be real due to the fact that ZRSR2 and U2AF1 are known to interact with each other, and all three proteins are localized in the nucleus.

Evolutionary History 
The protein is found in all taxa of the domain eukarya, including unicellular organisms. Aligning the human gene with the various taxids revealed high conservation in the G-patch domain area and the DUF 4187 area. Alignments with closely related taxids such as birds and reptiles revealed conservation over the majority of the sequence. However, alignments with more distantly related taxids such as fungi and plants had less conservation with identities of less than 40%, though the G-patch domain and the DUF domain still had high conservation. Overall, the protein is composed mainly of charged amino acids, both acidic and basic. There were no regions of sustained non-polarity. This implies that this is not a transmembrane protein as that requires a long region of non-polarity. 

When comparing the rate of evolution of GPATCH11 to known proteins such as fibrinogen and cytochrome c, GPATCH11 is evolving quite rapidly, similar to the rate of the fibrinogen protein. An unrooted evolutionary tree can be seen to the right including representatives of species ranging from invertebrates to mammals. This shows the hypothetical relationship of the GPATCH11 sequence among the different taxa, and is supported by divergence time of the taxa from humans as well as sequence identity/similarity.

Homology 
The protein is highly conserved among the domain eukarya. The table below lists a number of species from all different taxids whose GPATCH11 sequence was compared to the human GPATCH11 sequence. Protein sequence lengths, similarities, and identities are represented, including divergence in millions of years.

Clinical significance
Clinical significance is not yet known, however, GPATCH11 is present in much higher amounts in cancerous tissue than normal tissue, and has shown possible protein interaction with oncogenes, so might somehow be involved in cancer.

References